Lomond is a village in southern Alberta, Canada that is surrounded by Vulcan County. The village is a farming service community. Lomond was named for Loch Lomond, Scotland.

Demographics 

In the 2016 Census of Population conducted by Statistics Canada, the Village of Lomond recorded a population of 166 living in 73 of its 101 total private dwellings, a  change from its 2011 population of 173.

Government 
The village is governed by a village council comprising a mayor, and two councillors, and is administered by a village chief administrative officer.

Sports 
Lomond is home to the Lomond Lakers of the Heritage Junior B Hockey League. The team was added as an expansion team in the league for the 2018–19 season.

They originally played out of the Lomond Community Centre. In April 2018, issues were discovered with the centre's roof and in May 2019, the centre was demolished. The team currently plays its home games in Claresholm, 110 km west of Lomond.

See also 
List of communities in Alberta
List of villages in Alberta

References

External links 

1916 establishments in Alberta
Populated places established in 1916
Villages in Alberta
Vulcan County